Siegfried Fricke (born 19 November 1954) is a German rower who competed for West Germany in the 1976 Summer Olympics and later became a politician.

He was born in Bralorne, British Columbia, Canada.

In 1976 he was a crew member of the West German boat which won the bronze medal in the coxed fours event.

External links
 sports-reference.com
 giessener-allgemeine.de 
 Official website 

1954 births
Living people
Olympic rowers of West Germany
Rowers at the 1976 Summer Olympics
Olympic bronze medalists for West Germany
Politicians from Hesse
Christian Democratic Union of Germany politicians
Olympic medalists in rowing
West German male rowers
Medalists at the 1976 Summer Olympics